The 2017 Moçambola is the 40th season of top-tier football in Mozambique. The season began on 4 March 2017. Ferroviário Beira are the defending champions coming off their first league title (they had won two colonial championships prior to independence).

Teams
The league is made up of 16 teams with Lichinga, Macuácua and Textáfrica being promoted from regional groups and Desportivo Maputo, Desportivo Niassa and Estrela Vermelha Maputo relegated after finishing in the bottom three spots of the standings in 2016.

Stadiums and locations

League table

Positions by round

References

Moçambola
Mozambique
Mozambique
football